The 1936–37 season was Chelsea Football Club's twenty-eighth competitive season. In May and June, Chelsea took part in the invitational Tournoi international de l'Exposition Universelle de Paris and reached the final, where they lost to Italian champions Bologna.

Table

Notes

References

External links
 1936–37 season at stamford-bridge.com

1936–37
English football clubs 1936–37 season